Americana is the fifth studio album by American rock band the Offspring, released on November 17, 1998, by Columbia Records. Following a worldwide tour in support of Ixnay on the Hombre (1997), the band commenced work on a new album in July 1998.

Americana was a major success, debuting at number six on the US Billboard 200 and selling over 175,000 copies in its first week. It is the band's second best-selling album after their 1994 breakout, Smash, and has sold over ten million copies worldwide. Americana spawned the hit singles "Pretty Fly (for a White Guy)", "Why Don't You Get a Job?" and "The Kids Aren't Alright", and was promoted with a worldwide tour and an appearance at the Woodstock '99 festival.

Background and recording
After the unexpected success of Smash (1994), the Offspring were signed to Columbia Records in 1996, releasing the fourth studio album, Ixnay on the Hombre (1997). Although Ixnay on the Hombre was not as well received as Smash, it managed simultaneous gold and platinum certifications in the United States in April 1997. After touring in support of Ixnay on the Hombre, the Offspring began writing new material for their next album. Frontman Dexter Holland told Rolling Stone in August 1998, "I wanted to write a record that wasn't a radical departure from what we've done before. I feel like we have managed to change stuff up from Ignition to Smash to Ixnay. We're in a place where we more or less set the boundaries where we can do a lot of stuff without having to stretch it out farther ... and do a swing song or something."

Recording took place from July to September 1998 at Eldorado Recording Studios with producer Dave Jerden, who also produced Ixnay on the Hombre. Holland told Guitar World, "The idea wasn't to reinvent the wheel. We expanded our horizons on our last record and that's okay, but I don't feel like you have to be a completely different band on every record." While most songs are the regular punk rock the band popularized, others such as the Latino-influenced "Pretty Fly (for a White Guy)" and the psychedelic "Pay the Man" add variety, "so that there's enough in there so people don't get bored". "Pay the Man" was even left off Ixnay on the Hombre for sounding too different from anything else the band had currently made at that time. The structure of the song more resembles progressive rock (having no repetitive sections and no continuous musical theme). Holland also contributed the song "Too Much Drama" to the Vandals' album Hitler Bad, Vandals Good, which was released five months before Americana. The chorus melody is reused on this album on the song "Walla Walla".

Composition
 
Americana contains themes of unhappy American lifestyles.  Speaking of the album shortly after its release, Holland explained, "The songs on Americana aren't condemnations, they're short stories about the state of things and what we see going on around us.  We want to expose the darker side of our culture. It may look like an episode of Happy Days out there in America, but it feels more like Twin Peaks."  He detailed that Americana was not thought right away as a concept album and "this really cool social statement", though once the band recorded a few songs complaining about 1998 America, "then  we realized we had a theme".

Holland also explained that Americana  served as "a commentary on American culture", satirizing hypocritical lives and political correctness. One of the influences was The Jerry Springer Show, with the band even considering naming the album after the show's news tickers such as "Stripper Wars". A major source of inspiration was seeing the people in Holland's hometown of Huntington Beach, such as the "wiggers" who were mocked in "Pretty Fly (for a White Guy)". Despite dealing with aimlessness and disillusionment, derived from how the generation that had just got to adulthood was having problems in getting jobs and sustaining themselves, Holland declared that "I didn't want it to be a record that made you feel hopeless. At the end of the day I hope that you can get something positive out of it."

Release and reception

Americana was released on November 17, 1998, and peaked at number 2 on the Billboard 200 album chart, the highest position the band attained at the time, and their highest thus far. Shortly after its release, the album was certified gold and then later platinum.

The album received mixed reviews, Michael Gallucci of AllMusic described the album as a "raucous ride through America as seen through the eyes of a weary, but still optimistic, young kid". Gallucci praised the music as "a hearty combination of poppy punk" and a "blend of salsa and alterna-rock sounds", stating the band's music was taking a different direction. The album received a rating of three out of five stars, while "Pretty Fly (for a White Guy)", "Why Don't You Get a Job?", "The Kids Aren't Alright" and "She's Got Issues" earned the Offspring its heaviest airplay on MTV and radio stations to date. In a review for the Offspring's 2000 studio album Conspiracy of One, the A.V. Club critic Stephen Thompson harkens back to Americana regarding the album's novelty songs being similar to the single Original Prankster. Thompson called Americana, "the unbearable result being the kind of stupidity that thinks it's clever," and suggested that it hold the title of the worst album of the 1990s, stating "[Americana is] a record bad enough to create a backlash against not only pop-punk, but also novelty songs, guitars, smug thirtysomethings, and the human race."

Americana is the 224th best selling album of all time according to Billboard as of 2009. The album was included in Rock Sounds 101 Modern Classics list at number 79. The album was included at number 23 on Rock Sounds "The 51 Most Essential Pop Punk Albums of All Time" list. NME listed the album as one of "20 Pop Punk Albums Which Will Make You Nostalgic".

The album was named at the 2000 Juno Awards as one of the best-selling albums that year.

Packaging
Artist Frank Kozik was hired to do the artwork for the album, as Holland found that his concert tour posters "had all the connotations we associated with Americana: very glossy, innocent and 1950s, but with a twisted aspect." Kozik, who had known the singer for a long time, was reluctant to work for the band due to the reception his fans would have, eventually demanding $75,000 to do the Americana illustrations. The album's cover art features a blond boy with an orthopedic boot seated on a swing holding a sand flea with a tentacle reaching out to him. Kozik had originally done said illustration for a Nebraskan band, Ritual Device, and reused it as the cover of his book Man's Ruin: The Poster Art Of Frank Kozik. On the booklet, which Holland described as "a little Kozik picture book", every song has its own accompanying illustration.

Some pressings of Americana are also enhanced CDs and contain the karaoke videos of "Staring at the Sun", "Pretty Fly (for a White Guy)" and "Why Don't You Get a Job?", and the previous MTV music videos from its predecessor, Ixnay on the Hombre.

Track listing
All songs written and composed by Dexter Holland, except where noted.

 "Pay the Man" ends at 8:10, followed by the hidden track "Pretty Fly (Reprise)" at 9:15. The track is a mariachi reprise of the song "Pretty Fly (for a White Guy)". The online download release of Americana has "Pay the Man" as track 13 and "Pretty Fly (Reprise)" separately, with the reprise of "Pretty Fly (for a White Guy)" as track 14. The main riff on "Pay the Man", particularly the drum part, is the same as found on the title track of Smash during the acoustic version of "Come Out and Play".

Charts

Weekly charts

Year-end charts

Decade-end charts

Certifications

Personnel

The Offspring
Dexter Holland – lead vocals, rhythm guitar, lead guitar on "Pay the Man"
Noodles – lead guitar, backing vocals, rhythm guitar on "Pay the Man"
Greg K. – bass, uncredited backing vocals
Ron Welty – drums

Additional musicians
 Carlos Goméz – guitar on "Why Don't You Get a Job?" & "Pay the Man"
 Derrick Davis – flute on "Why Don't You Get a Job?" & "Pay the Man"
 Chris "X-13" Higgins – vocals (background) on "Pretty Fly (For a White Guy)"
 Gabrial McNair – horn on "Why Don't You Get a Job?" & "Pay the Man"
 Alvaro Macias – vihuela on "Why Don't You Get a Job?" & "Pay the Man"
 Phil Jordan – horn on "Why Don't You Get a Job? & "Pay the Man"
 Calvert DeForest - vocals (background) on "Why Don't You Get a Job?"
 Heidi Villagran - vocals (background) on "Why Don't You Get a Job?"
 Davey Havok – vocals (background) on "Pretty Fly (For a White Guy)", "Why Don't You Get a Job?" & "Pay the Man"
 Jack Grisham – vocals (background) on "Pretty Fly (For a White Guy)", "Why Don't You Get a Job?" & "Pay the Man"
 Nika Frost – vocals (background) on "Pretty Fly (For a White Guy)", "Why Don't You Get a Job?" & "Pay the Man"
 John Mayer – vocals on "Welcome", vocals (additional) on "Pretty Fly (Reprise)"

Production
 Dave Jerden – producer, mixing
 Bryan Carlstrom – engineer
 Annette Cisneros – assistant engineer
 Eddy Schreyer – mastering

Artwork
 Sean Evans – art direction
 Justin Beope – artwork
 Frank Kozik – artwork

References

Notes

Sources

Bibliography

External links
 Official page for the album
 Americana at YouTube (streamed copy where licensed)

1998 albums
Albums produced by Dave Jerden
Columbia Records albums
The Offspring albums